Mohamed Badr Hassan (born 25 November 1989) is an Egyptian-born footballer who plays as a midfielder for Europa and the Gibraltar national team.

Career
Badr Hassan made his international debut for Gibraltar on 10 October 2019 in a friendly match against Kosovo, which finished as a 0–1 away loss.

On 20 August 2021, Badr Hassan joined Mons Calpe on loan for the first half of the 2021–22 season.

Personal life
Badr Hassan was born in the Cairo district of Maadi. He became a British Overseas Territories citizen in late 2019, after 5 years living in Gibraltar and playing for Lynx.

Career statistics

International

References

External links
 

1989 births
Living people
Footballers from Cairo
Gibraltarian footballers
Gibraltar international footballers
Egyptian footballers
Gibraltarian people of Egyptian descent
Association football midfielders
Europa F.C. players
Ittihad El Shorta SC players
Lynx F.C. players
Mons Calpe S.C. players
Gibraltar National League players
Egyptian expatriate footballers
Expatriate footballers in Gibraltar
Egyptian expatriate sportspeople in Gibraltar